Varlamov is a rural locality (a khutor) in Proninskoye Rural Settlement, Serafimovichsky District, Volgograd Oblast, Russia. The population was 297 as of 2010. There are 11 streets.

Geography 
Varlamov is located 71 km southwest of Serafimovich (the district's administrative centre) by road. Pronin is the nearest rural locality.

References 

Rural localities in Serafimovichsky District